The 2017 European Darts Open was the eighth of twelve PDC European Tour events on the 2017 PDC Pro Tour. The tournament took place at Ostermann-Arena, Leverkusen, Germany, between 30 June–2 July 2017. It featured a field of 48 players and £135,000 in prize money, with £25,000 going to the winner.

Michael van Gerwen was the defending champion after defeating Peter Wright 6–5 in the final of the 2016 tournament, but lost 6–2 in the third round to Rob Cross.

Peter Wright won the tournament, defeating Mervyn King 6–2 in the final.

Prize money
This is how the prize money is divided:

Qualification and format 
The top 16 entrants from the PDC ProTour Order of Merit on 11 May automatically qualified for the event and were seeded in the second round.

The remaining 32 places went to players from five qualifying events – 18 from the UK Qualifier (held in Wigan on 16 June), eight from the West/South European Qualifier (held on 29 June), four from the Host Nation Qualifier (held on 29 June), one from the Nordic & Baltic Qualifier (held on 19 May) and one from the East European Qualifier (held on 22 June).

Adrian Lewis withdrew for health reasons the day before the event, meaning a fifth Host Nation Qualifier took his place.

On 2 July, Joe Cullen withdrew before his third round match after his father suffered a heart attack; consequently Mensur Suljović was given a bye to the quarter-finals.

The following players took part in the tournament:

Top 16
  Michael van Gerwen (third round)
  Peter Wright (champion)
  Mensur Suljović (semi-finals)
  Simon Whitlock (second round)
  Michael Smith (semi-finals)
  Kim Huybrechts (second round)
  Benito van de Pas (second round)
  Jelle Klaasen (second round)
  Ian White (second round)
  Dave Chisnall (quarter-finals)
  Alan Norris (third round)
  Daryl Gurney (third round)
  Gerwyn Price (quarter-finals)
  Joe Cullen (third round, withdrew)
  Stephen Bunting (third round)
  Rob Cross (quarter-finals)

UK Qualifier
  James Wade (second round)
  Mervyn King (runner-up)
  Ray Campbell (first round)
  Richard North (first round)
  Peter Jacques (second round)
  Kyle Anderson (first round)
  Adrian Lewis (withdrew)
  Mark Walsh (second round)
  Aden Kirk (second round)
  Nathan Aspinall (first round)
  Matt Clark (first round)
  Robbie Green (second round)
  Justin Pipe (first round)
  John Henderson (quarter-finals)
  Mark Webster (first round)
  James Richardson  (third round)
  Mark Barilli (first round)
  Devon Petersen (third round)

West/South European Qualifier
  Jermaine Wattimena (first round)
  Dimitri Van den Bergh (third round)
  Christian Kist (second round)
  Jerry Hendriks (second round)
  Michael Plooy (first round)
  Cristo Reyes (first round)
  Vincent van der Voort (second round)
  Zoran Lerchbacher (first round)

Host Nation Qualifier
  Dragutin Horvat (first round)
  Martin Schindler (first round)
  Christian Bunse (first round)
  Steffen Siepmann (second round)
  Robert Allenstein (second round)

Nordic & Baltic Qualifier
  Kim Viljanen (first round)

East European Qualifier
  Krzysztof Ratajski (second round)

Draw

References 

2017 PDC European Tour
2017 in German sport